Montenegrin municipal elections were held in all 23 municipalities, between April 2016 and May 2018.

Results

2016 elections

Tivat

This election was boycotted by several opposition parties and coalitions due to unfair conditions.

Budva

Kotor

Andrijevica

Gusinje

2017 elections

Nikšić

Local election for Nikšić Municipality was held on 12 March 2017. It was boycotted by all the opposition parties after the Government announced the imprisonment of the leaders of the opposition coalition Democratic Front. Only the ruling DPS and its minor partner SD ran in the election, with voter turnout at 45%, while 11% of the votes cast were spoilt.

Herceg Novi

Cetinje

Mojkovac

Petnjica

2018 elections

Berane

Ulcinj

Plužine

Bar

Bijelo Polje

Danilovgrad

Kolašin

Plav

Pljevlja

Podgorica

Rožaje

Šavnik

Žabljak

Statistics

Elected mayors and local governments

Seats in local parliaments

Mayoral seats

References

2016-18
2016 elections in Europe
2016 in Montenegro